Jürgen Osterhammel (born 1952 in Wipperfürth, North Rhine-Westphalia) is a German historian specialized in Chinese and world history. He is professor emeritus at the University of Konstanz.

Academia
Osterhammel started his academic career as a research fee student at the London School of Economics in 1976/77 and studied and worked there under Professor Ian Nish. In 1980, he obtained his PhD from the University of Kassel in modern history. 

Two years later, Osterhammel started as a fellow at the German Historical Institute in London. Between 1986 and 1990, he was a senior lecturer in political science at the University of Freiburg (Germany). Osterhammel then worked for seven years as professor of modern history at the FernUniversität Hagen, a distance-learning university and the university with the highest enrollment in Germany. He has also worked as a professor of modern history at the Graduate Institute of International Studies in Geneva before taking up the same position in the University of Konstanz (Germany) in 1999. In 2001–2002, Osterhammel was a fellow at the Netherlands Institute for Advanced Study in the Humanities and Social Sciences. In 2014, he was elected a Corresponding Fellow of the British Academy.

Other activities
 Volkswagen Foundation, Member of the Board of Trustees

Awards
 In 2010, Osterhammel received the Gottfried Wilhelm Leibniz Prize a program of the Deutsche Forschungsgemeinschaft (German Research Foundation) for "exceptional scientists and academics for their outstanding achievements in the field of research."
 2014: Sigmund Freud Prize
 2017: Pour le Mérite for Sciences and Arts
 In 2018, Osterhammel received the Balzan Prize for Global History "For his fundamental contribution to studies in global history and the definition of the discipline. For his method, which combines the rigour of empirical research while opening onto wide perspectives in an admirably balanced way, both through comparison and through the study of interconnected histories. For his elegant, fascinating style of writing."

Areas of Research
Colonialism
Eurasian history since the 18th century
History and theory of historiography
World or global history

Bibliography

References

External links
Jurgen Osterhammel on Amazon
Detailed interview with J. Osterhammel in the journal Itinerario

1952 births
Living people
People from Wipperfürth
Academic staff of the University of Konstanz
Gottfried Wilhelm Leibniz Prize winners
Knights Commander of the Order of Merit of the Federal Republic of Germany
Recipients of the Pour le Mérite (civil class)
University of Kassel alumni
Corresponding Fellows of the British Academy
Writers about globalization
Historians of colonialism
20th-century German historians
21st-century German historians
Academic staff of the Graduate Institute of International and Development Studies
Academics of the German Historical Institute London